This is a list of electoral results for the electoral district of Geelong West in Victorian state elections.

Members

 Foott died 24 September 1868, replaced by Graham Berry in October 1868.
Johnstone and Berry went on to represent the re-created Geelong from 1877.

Election results

Elections in the 1980s

Elections in the 1970s

Elections in the 1960s

Elections in the 1950s

References

Victoria (Australia) state electoral results by district